Chris Riley (born 22 February 1988) is an English former professional rugby league footballer who played in the 2000s and 2010s.

Background
Chris Riley was born in Longford, Cheshire, England. 

He was a pupil at Penketh High School, Warrington.

Playing career
Chris Riley has a fine strike rate at Super League level, Riley was primarily a fullback with England Academy and the Warrington junior grades, but he has forged his first team career to date on the wing. A well balanced and elusive runner who has added some strength to his build since débuting in late 2005 at the age of 17. A graduate of Woolston Rovers ARLFC and the Warrington Scholarship Scheme, he won Junior Academy titles in 2003 and 2004, represented England U17 against the Australian Institute of Sport in 2005 and made a try scoring début for England Academy the same season. After three seasons as a squad player, last year was his best season to date, featuring in the majority of Warrington's games and scoring try doubles on five occasions, including away at St Helens.

Riley attended Penketh High School in Warrington where he won the Warrington Schools Rugby League Final in years 7, 8, 9 and 10.

On 7 February 2010, he was in his sixth season of rugby during 2010's Super League XV.

Riley has played for Warrington in 3 winning Challenge Cup Finals of 2009, 2010 and 2012 where he scored his 1st try in a Cup Final for his hometown club.

He played in the 2010 Challenge Cup Final victory over the Leeds Rhinos at Wembley Stadium.

Chris joined Harlequins RL in May 2011 after agreeing an initial one-month loan deal, he made his début on the  against Castleford Tigers in a disappointing 56-24 loss, in which he scored two tries.

Now back playing for Warrington, Chris has made the trip to Australia with the team for their pre-season games and will be included in a squad to play Russell Crowe's South Sydney Rabbitohs at the Redfern Oval on Saturday, 28 January 2012.

He played in the 2012 Challenge Cup Final victory over the Leeds Rhinos at Wembley Stadium.

He played in the 2012 Super League Grand Final defeat by the Leeds Rhinos at Old Trafford.

He played in the 2013 Super League Grand Final defeat by the Wigan Warriors at Old Trafford.

In 2014, Chris signed to play for the Wakefield Trinity Wildcats on loan for 1-month, during April it was confirmed that he would stay for at least another month after his loan was extended.

References

External links
(archived by web.archive.org) Rochdale Hornets profile
Profile at warringtonwolves.com

1988 births
Living people
England Knights national rugby league team players
English rugby league players
London Broncos players
Rochdale Hornets players
Rugby league fullbacks
Rugby league players from Warrington
Rugby league wingers
Swinton Lions players
Wakefield Trinity players
Warrington Wolves players
Woolston Rovers players